Furious Slaughter (also known as Superdragon or The Deadly Bunch) is a 1972 Hong Kong martial arts Kung Fu action film. It stars Jimmy Wang Yu and is a prequel to Ma Su Chen (1972).

Plot "Furious Slaughter". letterboxd. Retrieved 29 June 2016

When a martial arts expert discovers the existence of an illegal slave trade in the 1930s, he goes to great lengths to overthrow it.

Cast
Jimmy Wang Yu as Ma Yuen Chen
Sally Chen Sha Li as Cheng Fei/Tai Fung
Miao Tien as croupier  at Pleasure Palace
Tien Yeh as Chow Chun Pai's thug
Sit Hon as Ma Yuen Chen's friend
Ma Kei as Chow Chun Pai
Lung Fei as Chow Chun Pai's thug
Yee Yuen as Miyaki, Japanese fighter
Got Siu Bo as brothel (Paradise Club) owner
Shan Mao as Chow Chun Pai's lead thug
Lee Keung as Japanese fighter
Chui Lap as Axe gang thug
Poon Chuen Ling as Watanabe
Chu Fei as Chow Chun Pai's thug
Au Lap Bo as throws 3rd axe
Dung Gam Woo as food stall owner
Shih Ting Ken as Chow Chun Pai's thug
Man Man  
Su Chen Ping  
Hsieh Hsing  
Chi Fu Chiang  
Lan Chi  
Ng Ho  
Kong Yeung  
Chang I Fei  
Ho Wai Hung  
Cheong Siu Gwan  
Hoh Gong  
Wang Han Chen  
Hong Dai Tung 
Chow Chi Kei  
Cheung Chung Kwai as extra
Cheung Yee Kwai as extra
Gam Man Hei as extra
Tsang Ming Cheong as extra
Kwan Hung as extra
Wong Wing Sang as extra

References

External links
 Furious Slaughter at Hong Kong Cinemagic 
 
 
 Furious Slaughter at Letterboxd

1972 films
Hong Kong martial arts films
1970s action films
1970s Mandarin-language films
Films directed by Ting Shan-hsi